This article presents the complete discography of American singer/songwriter Jarboe. It covers her work in bands such as Swans, Skin and Blackmouth as well as her solo recording output.

As a Solo artist

Studio albums

Collaborative albums

Remix albums

Extended plays

Compilation albums

Soundtrack albums

As a band member

With Swans

With Skin

With Blackmouth

With AEAEA

Credits

References

External links
Jarboe at Discogs

Discographies of American artists
Rock music discographies